Coyle is a surname of Irish origin.

People sharing this surname 
Andrew Coyle (contemporary), British law professor and prison official
Anthony Coyle (American football) (born 1996), American football player
Bill Coyle (baseball) (1871–1941), American baseball player
Bill Coyle (born ?), American poet
Brendan Coyle (born 1963), English actor
Brian Coyle (1944–1991), American gay rights activist
Brock Coyle (born 1990)  American Football Player 
Charles Delmer Coyle (1887–1954), Canadian politician from Ontario; MP from Elgin 1945–54
Charlie Coyle (born 1992), American ice hockey player
Charlotte Coyle (born 1982), Northern Ireland plus-size model
Cleo Coyle or Alice Alfonsi, American author
Colm Coyle (born 1965), Irish Gaelic football player and manager
Craig Coyle (born 1980), Scottish footballer
Dallas Coyle (contemporary), American guitarist
David Coyle (born 1970) Scottish guitarist and music producer
Denise Coyle (born 1953), American politician from New Jersey; state legislator since 2008
Diane Coyle (born 1961), English economist
Eithne Coyle (1897–1985), Irish Republican
Eric Coyle (born 1963), American football player
Fay Coyle (1933–2007), Northern Ireland football player
Frank Coyle (1886–1947), American Olympic track and field athlete
Harold Coyle (born 1952), American author of war novels (Team Yankee)
Henry Coyle (boxer) (born 1987), Irish boxer
Henry Coyle (politician) (died 1979), Irish army officer and politician; TD for Mayo North
Iain Coyle (born 1968), British TV presenter and producer
James Coyle (rugby league) (born 1985), English rugby league player
James Coyle (1873–1921), American Roman Catholic priest
Joey Coyle (1953–1993), American longshoreman who found $1.2 million that had fallen from an armored car
John Coyle (footballer) (born 1932), Scottish football player
John Coyle (speed skater) (born 1968), American speed skater
Liam Coyle (born 1968), Northern Ireland football player
Marion Coyle (born 1954), Irish member of the Provisional IRA
Mark Coyle (born 1969), Athletics director at the University of Minnesota
Mark J. Coyle (–2007), American political consultant
Matt Coyle (born 1971), English-born Australian artist and novelist
Michael Coyle (politician) (born 1948), Northern Ireland nationalist politician; member of the Northern Ireland Assembly 2002
Michael Patrick Coyle (born 1957), American composer
Nadine Coyle (born 1985), Irish pop singer
Owen Coyle (born 1966), Scottish-born football player playing for Ireland
Pat Coyle (lacrosse) (born 1969), Canadian lacrosse player
Pat Coyle (basketball) (contemporary), American basketball coach
Reg Coyle (born 1917), Australian Australian Rules Footballer
Richard Coyle (born 1972), English actor
Richard Coyle (pirate) (died 1738), English pirate
Robert Everett Coyle (1930-2012), United States federal judge
Robert J. Coyle, American Roman Catholic bishop
Ronnie Coyle (born 1964), Scottish football player
Rose Coyle (1914–1988), American beauty queen; Miss America 1936
Ross Coyle (born 1937), American football player
Roy Coyle (born 1946), Northern Ireland football player and coach
T. Thorn Coyle (born 1965), American neopaganist author
Thomas Coyle (rugby league) (born 1988), English rugby league player
Thomas Coyle (accused of murder) (fl. 1871), Canadian acquitted of the murder of George Campbell
Tim Coyle (born 1960), Australian cricketer
Tommy Coyle (born 1989), British professional boxer
Tony Coyle (born 1976), South African footballer
Tyler Coyle (born 1998), American football player
William R. Coyle (1878–1962), American politician from Pennsylvania; U.S. representative 1925–33

Fictional characters sharing this surname 

Eddie Coyle, protagonist of the novel and film The Friends of Eddie Coyle
Malcolm Coyle, character on the American television series Oz
Joseph Coyle, security guard at the casino in Ocean's Eleven
Dr. Coyle, a scientist from Arms
 Coyle, a fictional military tutor in Benjamin Britten's opera Owen Wingrave and in the short story by Henry James on which it was based

English-language surnames